Alien Crush is a pinball video game developed by Compile for the PC Engine/TurboGrafx-16. It was released in 1988.  The game is the first installment in the Crush Pinball series. It was followed by three sequels, Devil's Crush, Jaki Crush, and Alien Crush Returns. Alien Crush was later rereleased on the Virtual Console and on the PlayStation Network.

Alien Crush garnered generally favorable reception from critics, some of which reviewed it as an import title; praise was given to the unusual and original graphical design reminiscent of the Alien films, realistic physics, accessibility towards less experience players and playability but some felt divided regarding its audio, while the transition between the two screens and lack of variety in gameplay aside from the bonus rounds were seen as negative points. Retrospective commentary has been mostly positive.

Gameplay 

Alien Crush features a science fiction theme reminiscent of the film Alien. Essentially, the player is "fighting" against the aliens with their pinball skills.

The playfield of Alien Crush consists of two main screens arranged vertically, with a pair of flippers at the bottom of each. The play stops momentarily as the ball shifts from one screen to the next. There are also several hidden/bonus rooms. These hidden rooms mainly involve destroying all the aliens (or several waves of aliens) for bonus points.

The player is given the choice of a fast or slow ball speed and two different music tracks.

Development and release

Reception 

Alien Crush garnered generally favorable reception from critics, some of which reviewed it as an import title. It was given the "Gold Hall of Fame" award from Famitsu and ranked at the number 110 spot with a 22.66 out of 30 score in a public poll taken by PC Engine Fan. Julian Rignall of Computer and Video Games Mean Machines highlighted its graphics reminiscent of the Alien films, atmospheric soundtrack and wide variety of bonus screens, writing that "This stunning pinball simulation is the best yet seen on any machine." Power Plays Martin Gaksch concurred with Rignall, lauding its well-drawn visuals and atmospheric sound design. Gaksch also commended the game's realistic physics and accessibility towards less experience players, but expressed dislike regarding the transition between the two screens. The Games Machines Warren Lapworth found its graphical design unusual and original when compared to titles such as Captain Blood and Purple Saturn Day. Lapworth commented that the music was competent but forgettable, while noting its lack of variety in gameplay aside from the bonus rounds. TurboPlays Donn Nauert gave the title positive ratings for its audiovisual presentation and playability.

Retrospective coverage 
Retrospective reviews for Alien Crush have been mostly positive. Nintendo Lifes Corbie Dillard praised its addictive gameplay, Alien-themed visuals and audio. IGNs Lucas M. Thomas commended the game's presentation, graphics, audio and engaging gameplay, but noted its limited scope. Nevertheless, Thomas stated that "This Turbo title is an important installment in the industry's pinball genre, and set the bar high for the games to come after it in later years." GameSpots Aaron Thomas gave positive remarks to its addictive and fun gameplay, catchy music tracks, colorful visuals, interesting table design reminiscent of H.R. Gigers artwork, depth and controls, but the lack of save support for high scores and single table were seen as negative points. In contrast, Eurogamers Kristan Reed felt that "this is a game that even hardcore pinball nutters will (or should) tire of after a few minutes", criticizing its lack of "neat" ideas and single table restriction. Retro Gamers Darran Jones wrote that "This wonderfully polished pinball title has a decent main table, solid ball physics and plenty of excellent table features". Hardcore Gaming 101s Kurt Kalata found it to be the most balanced entry in the Crush Pinball, labeling it as a "fun experience to both newcomers as well as experts."

Sequels
Alien Crush was the first game in the Crush Pinball series developed by Compile and distributed by Naxat Soft and later Hudson Soft. A common theme amongst all installments in the series that sets them apart from other pinball games is the presence of sci-fi, fantasy or occult themes.

Devil's Crush was released in 1990 also for the TurboGrafx-16, which featured an occult theme with skulls, skeletons, and demons. Devil's Crush was ported to the Sega Genesis, retitled Dragon's Fury (Devil Crash MD in Japan), by developer Technosoft. A third game was later developed for the Super Famicom called Jaki Crush that contained a Japanese demon/ogre mythology theme, although the game was never released outside Japan.

The series was revived in 2008 when Hudson Soft published a sequel/remake to Alien Crush called Alien Crush Returns for WiiWare.

While Jaki Crush became largely obscure, Alien Crush and Devil's Crush were well received and have both been re-released on the Virtual Console.

Demon's Tilt was released in 2019. The game has been called a spiritual successor to the Crush Pinball series, namely Devil's Crush.

Games list
Alien Crush - 1988 - TG16
Devil's Crush - 1990 - TG16
Jaki Crush - 1992 - Super Famicom
Dragon's Revenge - 1993 - Mega Drive (a follow-up to Devil's Crush, developed by Tengen)
Alien Crush Returns - 2008 - WiiWare (developed by Tamsoft)

References

External links
 Hudson's Official Site
 Nintendo's Virtual Console Alien Crush Site
 IGN's Review of Alien Crush
 Gamespot's Alien Crush Review
 Hard Core Gaming 101 - Crush Pinball

1988 video games
Compile (company) games
Crush Pinball
Kaga Create games
Pinball video games
TurboGrafx-16 games
Video games about extraterrestrial life
Video games developed in Japan
Video games scored by Toshiaki Sakoda
Virtual Console games
Virtual Console games for Wii U
PlayStation Network games
Single-player video games
Science fiction video games